Thomas Rhett most commonly refers to:
 Thomas Rhett Akins Jr. (born 1990), American country music singer-songwriter and son of Rhett Akins

Thomas Rhett may also refer to:
 Thomas Rhett Akins Sr. (born 1969), known as Rhett Akins, American country music singer-songwriter and father of Thomas Rhett
 Thomas Grimke Rhett (1821-1878), United States Army officer who served in the Mexican-American War and American Civil War
 Thomas Rhett Smith (1768-1829), 21st mayor of Charleston, South Carolina, United States
 Thomas Rhett (EP), 2012 self-titled debut extended play by country musician Thomas Rhett Akins Jr.

See also
 Rhett